Scoparia subgracilis is a moth in the family Crambidae. It was described by Sasaki in 1998. It is found in Taiwan and China (Chongqing, Guizhou, Henan, Shaanxi).

References

Moths described in 1998
Scorparia